Yvette Denise Lee Bowser (born 1965) is an American television writer and producer. She wrote and produced the TV shows Living Single and Half & Half, and early in her career, worked on The Cosby Show spin-off A Different World. With Living Single, she became the first African-American woman to develop her own primetime series.

Career
Bowser started on A Different World in 1987 as one of a number of apprentices, rising in prominence in the production company over the years and eventually becoming producer by the 1991–92 season. She left the show to take a position with Hangin' with Mr. Cooper.

Bowser created her own company, Sister Lee Productions, which produced or co-produced her later shows, Living Single and Half & Half. She has said in an interview that she draws many of her characters and plots from her own and her friends' personal experiences. She has said, "I just basically rip pages out of my diary to tell stories on TV." In the case of Half & Half, for example, the writer based the characters Mona and Dee-Dee on herself and an older half-sister, and plot ideas came from her experience as the youngest child in a blended family.

Through Sister Lee Productions, Bowser served as showrunner for the critically acclaimed Netflix series Dear White People, adapted with Justin Simien from his film of the same name.
 In 2020, she became the showrunner on the Starz original series Run the World, created by Leigh Davenport.

Personal life
Bowser lived in Philadelphia's Carroll Park neighborhood until age 5, when she and her mother moved to California. Bowser graduated from Santa Monica High School in 1983. She attended with Holly Robinson, who was a part of the Hangin' with Mr. Cooper cast and later starred in For Your Love. Bowser also attended with her friend Lori Petty, whom she later cast in her sitcom Lush Life.

After high school, Bowser attended Stanford University where, in spring 1986, she pledged the Xi Beta chapter of Alpha Kappa Alpha sorority.

Yvette Lee married producer Kyle Bowser in 1994. The two worked together on Living Single, Half & Half, and For Your Love.

Filmography

References

External links

Television producers from California
American women television producers
American television writers
American women television writers
African-American screenwriters
1965 births
Living people
American women screenwriters
Writers from Philadelphia
People from Santa Monica, California
Place of birth missing (living people)
Stanford University alumni
20th-century American screenwriters
20th-century American women writers
21st-century American screenwriters
21st-century American women writers